Alvah August “Al” Keller (April 11, 1920 in Alexander, New York – November 19, 1961 in Phoenix, Arizona) was an American racecar driver.

NASCAR
Keller participated in the NASCAR Strictly Stock/Grand National series from 1949 to 1956 with 29 career starts. He won two races during the 1954 season and was the first driver in the history of NASCAR's top division to have won a race in a foreign-built car. Keller won the 1954 Grand National road-race at the Linden Airport in New Jersey, driving a Jaguar owned by big band leader Paul Whiteman. He also won by a two-lap margin at Oglethorpe Speedway in 1954.

IndyCar
In 1954 Keller began a transition to Championship Cars. He drove in the AAA and USAC Champ Car series, racing in the 1954-1959 and 1961 seasons with 32 starts, including the Indianapolis 500 six times. He was involved in the crash that killed Bill Vukovich in 1955. He finished in the top ten 13 times, with a best finish of 2nd two times (Atlanta in 1956, and Milwaukee in 1961). His best Indy 500 finish was 5th in 1961.

Death
Keller died as a result of injuries sustained in a Champ Car crash at the Arizona State Fairgrounds track.

Indianapolis 500 results

References

External links
 

1920 births
1961 deaths
Racing drivers from New York (state)
Indianapolis 500 drivers
NASCAR drivers
Racing drivers who died while racing
Sports deaths in Arizona
People from Alexander, New York